Bethel Census Area is a census area in the U.S. state of Alaska.  As of the 2020 census, the population is 18,666, up from 17,013 in 2010. It is part of the unorganized borough and therefore has no borough seat. Its largest community is the city of Bethel, which is also the largest city in the unorganized borough.

Geography
Its territory includes the large Nunivak Island in the Bering Sea.

Its land area is comparable to that of Kentucky, which has an area of slightly under forty thousand square miles.

Adjacent boroughs and census areas
 Kusilvak Census Area, Alaska - northwest
 Yukon-Koyukuk Census Area, Alaska - north
 Matanuska-Susitna Borough, Alaska - east
 Kenai Peninsula Borough, Alaska - southeast
 Lake and Peninsula Borough, Alaska - south
 Dillingham Census Area, Alaska - south

National protected areas
 Alaska Maritime National Wildlife Refuge (part of the Bering Sea unit)
 Bering Sea Wilderness
 Lake Clark National Park and Preserve (part)
 Lake Clark Wilderness (part)
 Togiak National Wildlife Refuge (part)
 Togiak Wilderness (part)
 Yukon Delta National Wildlife Refuge (part)
 Nunivak Wilderness

Demographics

As of the census of 2000, there were 16,006 people, 4,226 households, and 3,173 families living in the census area.  The population density was 0 people per square mile (0/km2).  There were 5,188 housing units at an average density of 0/sq mi (0/km2).  The racial makeup of the census area was 12.53% White, 0.38% Black or African American, 81.93% Native American, 1.05% Asian, 0.06% Pacific Islander, 0.19% from other races, and 3.85% from two or more races.  0.87% of the population were Hispanic or Latino of any race.
Of the 4,226 households, 51.00% had children under the age of 18 living with them, 50.20% were married couples living together, 15.20% had a female householder with no husband present, and 24.90% were non-families. 19.90% of households were one person, and 2.80% were one person aged 65 or older.  The average household size was 3.73 and the average family size was 4.41.

In the census area the population was spread out, with 39.80% under the age of 18, 9.70% from 18 to 24, 28.90% from 25 to 44, 16.40% from 45 to 64, and 5.20% 65 or older.  The median age was 25 years. For every 100 females, there were 113.20 males.  For every 100 females age 18 and over, there were 112.80 males.

Bethel Census Area is one of only 38 county-level census divisions of the United States where the most spoken language is not English and one of only 3 where it is neither English nor Spanish.  63.14% of the population speak a Yupik language at home, followed by English at 34.71%.

Politics

Communities

Cities

Akiak
Aniak
Bethel
Chefornak
Chuathbaluk
Eek
Goodnews Bay
Kwethluk
Lower Kalskag
Mekoryuk
Napakiak
Napaskiak
Nightmute
Nunapitchuk
Platinum
Quinhagak
Toksook Bay
Upper Kalskag

Census-designated places

Akiachak
Atmautluak
Crooked Creek
Kasigluk
Kipnuk
Kongiganak
Kwigillingok
Lime Village
Mertarvik
Newtok
Oscarville
Red Devil
Sleetmute
Stony River
Tuluksak
Tuntutuliak
Tununak

Unincorporated communities
Crow Village
Georgetown
Napaimute
Umkumiute

Education
School districts include:
 Iditarod Area School District
 Kuspuk School District
 Lower Kuskokwim School District
 Lower Yukon School District
 Yupiit School District

See also
List of Airports in the Bethel Census Area
Nunathloogagamiutbingoi Dunes

References

External links
 Census Area map, 2000 census: Alaska Department of Labor
 Census Area map, 2010 census: Alaska Department of Labor

 
Alaska census areas
Bering Sea
Populated places established in 1980
1980 establishments in Alaska